The Dream-Catchers (Simplified Chinese: 未来不是梦) is a Singaporean Chinese modern romance drama which was telecasted on Singapore's free-to-air channel, MediaCorp Channel 8. It stars Rui En, Tay Ping Hui, Jesseca Liu, Shaun Chen, Elvin Ng, Paige Chua, Nat Ho & Dawn Yeoh as the casts of the series. It made its debut on 4 February 2009 and ended on 3 March 2009. This drama serial consists of 20 episodes, and was screened on every weekday night at 9:00 pm.

This drama is known for having cast members consisting mainly of young actors and actresses, and travelled to Japan and Bintan for filming.

The Economic Development Board is the main sponsor for this series.

Note: This show is actually called "The Dream-Catchers" with a hyphen, but to change the page title would be a hassle so it's left as that.

Cast

Main cast

Other cast

Synopsis
Lin Jia Le (Jesseca Liu), Lin Jia Qi (Rui En), Wang Zhi Wei (Tay Ping Hui) and Jiang Cheng Feng (Shaun Chen) are 4 young engineers from different arena but with the same dream of making the world a better place for mankind. In the pursuit of their dreams, their path crosses.

Jia Le always feels that she is cursed and misfortune will befall any man she falls in love with. She finally relented when Zhi Wei proves her wrong with his actions and sincerity. An accident changes Jia Le's mind and she escapes by joining a humanitarian mission, with Zhi Wei hot on her heels.

Jia Qi and Cheng Feng also fall in love, but the latter's ex-fiancée Shan Shan (Eelyn Kok) re-appears and wants to reconcile. Jia Qi is one who cannot tolerate any blemishes in a relationship and decides to step out of the competition and leaves the country, finding new love. But she returns to find a depressed Cheng Feng after Shan Shan's evil ploys are exposed and the sudden death of his father.

Due to the trouble and hardships between Cheng Feng and Jia Qi, Jia Qi finds comfort in her suitor, Sato (Elvin Ng). Sato proves to be a devoted lover to her and Jia Qi gradually falls in love with him while Cheng Feng is dragged down by Shan Shan.

In between everything, Xiaowei (Paige Chua) who has been friends with Zhi Wei ever since they were young, starts to fall in love with him, making things even more complicated for them.

Awards & Nominations

Star Awards 2010

Trivia
This show is the first collaboration between Jesseca Liu and Rui En.
This show is the third pairing with Elvin Ng and Rui En, after Love at 0°C and By My Side.

External links
 

Singapore Chinese dramas
2009 Singaporean television series debuts
2009 Singaporean television series endings
Channel 8 (Singapore) original programming